Heitor Dhalia (born 18 January 1970) is a Brazilian film director and screenwriter. He has directed seven films since 1988. His film, À Deriva, competed in the Un Certain Regard section at the 2009 Cannes Film Festival.

Filmography
 A Pantomima da Morte (1988)
 Conceição (2000)
 As Três Marias (2002; screenplay)
 Nina (2004)
 O Cheiro do Ralo (2006)
 À Deriva (2009)
 Gone (2012)
 Serra Pelada (2013)
 On Yoga: The Architecture of Peace (2017)
  (2018)

References

External links

1970 births
Living people
Brazilian film directors
Brazilian screenwriters

Brazilian people of Romani descent